The Montana Western Railway  was an American railroad linking the towns of Conrad and Valier in Pondera County, Montana, a distance of .

The railroad was constructed in 1909 by the Valier Land and Water Company as part of an effort to develop new agricultural lands in the Valier area.  The line connected with the Great Northern Railway (GN) at Conrad, and the Great Northern later assumed control of the MW. The trackage continues to be operated today by the BNSF Railway, corporate successor to the GN.

Montana Western #31, a gas-electric railcar formerly operated by the railroad, is now preserved at the Mid-Continent Railway Museum in North Freedom, Wisconsin.  The #31, constructed in 1925, is the oldest surviving piece of equipment constructed by the Electro-Motive Company.

References

Defunct Montana railroads
Railway companies established in 1909
Railway companies disestablished in 1970
Pondera County, Montana
Predecessors of the Burlington Northern Railroad
Predecessors of the Great Northern Railway (U.S.)